Jordan Schmidt (born February 26, 1988) is a Grammy-nominated, multi-platinum songwriter and music producer. He has co-written, engineered or produced songs for Kane Brown, Morgan Wallen, Jason Aldean, Blake Shelton, blackbear, Dan + Shay, Keith Urban, Nelly, Florida Georgia Line, The Band Camino, HARDY, Tyler Hubbard, Kid Rock, Calum Scott, Granger Smith, Chris Lane, One Ok Rock, Old Dominion, Chase Rice, Dustin Lynch, Lady A, Hunter Hayes, Mitchell Tenpenny, Jimmie Allen, Ingrid Andress, Rodney Atkins, Mason Ramsey, All Time Low, and many others. Schmidt currently resides in Nashville, Tennessee.

Biography
Schmidt was born in Duluth, Minnesota, United States. Drawn to music at an early age, Schmidt picked up the guitar when he was 10 years old, and began recording local artists by the time he was 16. In 2006, he moved to College Park, Maryland where he took a job assisting for Matt Squire.  After working with Matt, he moved to Minneapolis, Minnesota and started producing & engineering for acts like Motion City Soundtrack, Quietdrive, Sing It Loud, You, Me, and Everyone We Know, Jamestown Story, Paradise Fears,  and The Role Call, quickly becoming one of the Midwest's most sought after producers.

In 2012, Jordan moved to Nashville, Tennessee, where he and his brother/manager Dane started their first business venture, WeVolve Music.  They spent the next two years racking up hundreds of syncs on shows like NCIS: New Orleans, Nashville, Catfish, Jersey Shore, The Biggest Loser, Dr. Phil, One Tree Hill, Keeping Up With The Kardashians, NBC Sunday Night Football, The Real World, Hart of Dixie, Snooki & JWoww, Teen Mom, Chesapeake Shores, 16 and Pregnant, The Challenge, True Life, Bad Girls Club, The Fosters, Kourtney and Khloé Take The Hamptons, Total Divas, Married at First Sight, Best Ink, Fox & Friends, Ridiculousness, The Hallmark Channel, Battle Creek, Heartland, 90210, Tucker Carlson Tonight, The First Time, and ad partnerships with MasterCard, CBS, Wayfair, NBC, JetBlue, Adobe and Coca-Cola, which eventually lead the Schmidt brothers to focus on songwriting & producing full-time.

In April 2015, Jordan Schmidt signed a publishing deal with Tree Vibez Music, founded by Brian Kelley and Tyler Hubbard of Florida Georgia Line,  and celebrated his first #1 song with Jason Aldean's "Lights Come On" on July 22, 2016. He secured his second #1 with Kane Brown's 7× Platinum hit "What Ifs" in October 2017, following that with Jason Aldean’s 6× Platinum, multi-week #1 "You Make It Easy", then Mitchell Tenpenny’s 2× Platinum, "Drunk Me". In July 2019, Schmidt was awarded his fifth #1 song with Blake Shelton’s 4x Platinum "God's Country", which went on to win the category of Single of the Year for the 53rd Annual Country Music Association Awards, and as well as earn a Grammy nomination for the 62nd Annual Grammy Awards in the Best Country Solo Performance category. During the pandemic, Jordan wrote & produced Nelly/Florida Georgia Line's 3x Platinum "Lil Bit" along with Blake Shelton's "Come Back As A Country Boy". Schmidt recently celebrated his sixth #1 as a songwriter with Kane Brown's "Like I Love Country Music," his second #1 as a producer with Mitchell Tenpenny's "Truth About You" in 2022, and currently has songs on the charts with Tyler Hubbard, Ingrid Andress, Lindsay Ell, and HARDY.

Personal life
In 2022, Schmidt married female country artist Renee Blair.

Discography

RIAA certifications

References

External links
 
 Interview with "The Sound Alarm"
 Partial Discography on "All Music"

Living people
1988 births
Record producers from Minnesota
Songwriters from Minnesota
People from Duluth, Minnesota
People from Nashville, Tennessee